Jana Novotná and Tine Scheuer-Larsen were the defending champions but they competed with different partners that year, Novotná with Helena Suková and Scheuer-Larsen with Catarina Lindqvist.

Lindqvist and Scheuer-Larsen lost in the semifinals to Isabelle Demongeot and Nathalie Tauziat.

Novotná and Suková lost the final on a walkover against Demongeot and Tauziat.

Seeds
Champion seeds are indicated in bold text while text in italics indicates the round in which those seeds were eliminated. All eight seeded teams received byes into the second round.

Draw

Final

Top half

Bottom half

External links
 1989 Citizen Cup Doubles Draw

1989 WTA Tour